Ascanio Parisi (died 23 April 1614) was a Roman Catholic prelate who served as Bishop of Marsico Nuovo (1600–1614) and Titular Bishop of Hebron (1599–1600).

Biography
On 2 August 1599, Ascanio Parisi was appointed Coadjutor Bishop of Marsico Nuovo and Titular Bishop of Hebron. by Pope Clement VIII.

On 29 August 1599, he was consecrated bishop by Domenico Pinelli, Cardinal-Priest of San Crisogono, with Leonard Abel, Titular Bishop of Sidon, and Scipione Spina, Bishop of Lecce, serving as co-consecrators. On 24 April 1600, he succeeded to the Bishopric of Marsico Nuovo, where he served until his death on 23 April 1614.

References

External links and additional sources
 (for Chronology of Bishops) (for Chronology of Bishops) 
 (for Chronology of Bishops) (for Chronology of Bishops) 
 (for Chronology of Bishops) (for Chronology of Bishops) 
 (for Chronology of Bishops) (for Chronology of Bishops) 

17th-century Italian Roman Catholic bishops
Bishops appointed by Pope Clement VIII
1614 deaths